Chaetocarpus coriaceus is a plant of the family Peraceae which is endemic to Sri Lanka.

Uses
Wood - fuelwood.

Culture
Known as පොල් හැඩවක (pol hedawaka) in Sinhala.

References

Peraceae
Endemic flora of Sri Lanka